Leone Cimpellin (6 June 1926 – 27 March 2017) was an Italian comic artist. He was sometimes credited under the pen name Ghilbert.

Life and career
Born in Rovigo, Cimpellin spent his childhood in Milan and at very young age he started his career as assistant of Lina Buffolente, with whom in 1942 he created his first comic strip, Petto di Pollo, published by Edizioni Alpe.  

After the war, Cimpellin started an autonomous career  illustrating the Italo-produced comic books of Casey Ruggles (Red Carson in Italy) with scripts of Mario Uggeri and then drawing Gian Luigi Bonelli's Plutos. In 1953, after collaborating with Guido Martina for the series Pecos Bill and Oklahoma, he became part of the permanent staff of the children magazine Corriere dei Piccoli, for which he created dozens of series, notably Codinzolo, Gibernetta, Tribunzio, Charlie Sprint, Gigi Buzz.  

In 1971, Cimpellin co-created with Romano Garofalo his best known work, the satirical comic series Jonny Logan, which run until  1978. After the series closed, he collaborated with several publications, including Corriere dei Piccoli, Gazzetta del Popolo, Più.

Further reading 

 Davide Barzi (cured by). Quaderni d'autore: Leo Cimpellin/Leo Ortolani. Edizioni IF, 2002.

References

External links
 Leone Cimpellin at Lambiek

1926 births
2017 deaths
People from Rovigo
Italian comics artists